Florian Hartherz (born 29 May 1993) is a German professional footballer who plays as a left-back for Polish club Podbeskidzie Bielsko-Biała.

References

External links
 

1993 births
Living people
Sportspeople from Offenbach am Main
German footballers
Footballers from Hesse
Association football fullbacks
Germany youth international footballers
Kickers Offenbach players
Eintracht Frankfurt players
VfL Wolfsburg players
VfL Wolfsburg II players
SV Werder Bremen II players
SV Werder Bremen players
SC Paderborn 07 players
Arminia Bielefeld players
Fortuna Düsseldorf players
Maccabi Netanya F.C. players
Podbeskidzie Bielsko-Biała players
Bundesliga players
2. Bundesliga players
3. Liga players
Israeli Premier League players

German expatriate footballers
Expatriate footballers in Israel
German expatriate sportspeople in Israel
Expatriate footballers in Poland
German expatriate sportspeople in Poland